Minglanilla is a municipality located in the province of Cuenca, Castile-La Mancha, Spain. According to the 2006 census (INE), the municipality had a population of 2,532 inhabitants.

References

Municipalities in the Province of Cuenca